Paul Camille Albert Mandrillon (6 September 1891 – 22 March 1969) was a French biathlete who competed in the early 1920s. At the 1924 Winter Olympics he won the bronze medal in the military patrol event, together with his younger brother Maurice; he was also the flag bearer of the French delegation, and took the Olympic Oath, the first for the Winter Olympics.

References

External links
1924 military patrol results
IOC 1924 Winter Olympics

1891 births
1969 deaths
French military patrol (sport) runners
Military patrol competitors at the 1924 Winter Olympics
Olympic biathletes of France
Olympic bronze medalists for France
People from Les Rousses
Medalists at the 1924 Winter Olympics
Sportspeople from Jura (department)
Oath takers at the Olympic Games